Károly Beregfy (12 February 1888 – 12 March 1946) was a Hungarian military officer and politician, who served as Minister of Defence in the 1944–45 Arrow Cross Party government.

He was born as Károly Berger in Cservenka (Crvenka). He fought in the First World War where he was seriously injured. Then he joined the Hungarian Red Army to fight against the rebel nationalities. Between 1939–41, he was commandant of the Royal Military Academy.

He fought in the Second World War from 1941 as commander of the VI Corps, and later commanded the Third Army and the First Army. In April 1944 he suffered a serious defeat by the Red Army. The commission examining the reasons of the defeat established Beregfy's personal responsibility, so he was dismissed from his field command.

He sympathized with the Arrow Cross Party from the beginning, although he could not join since under Hungarian Army regulations the members of political parties could not be officers in the Hungarian Army. After Operation Margarethe Arrow Cross leader Ferenc Szálasi sought him out and asked him to assist in a coup if Miklós Horthy tried to negotiate a surrender.

After the Arrow Cross Party's coup (15 and 16 October 1944) the new Prime Minister Szálasi appointed Beregfy as Minister of Defence. He also served as Chief of Army Staff. Beregfy declared Hungary a manoeuvre area on 30 October and subordinated all attainable human and economical resources  to the war.

On 30 April 1945 he was captured by U.S. Army troops. Brought to trial before the People's Tribunal he denied his guilt throughout. The court did not accept his arguments (Beregfy referred to disability and compulsion) and sentenced him to death. He was hanged on 12 March 1946, along with Ferenc Szálasi, Gábor Vajna, former interior minister in the Arrow Cross Party's cabinet and József Gera, who was a Hungarist ideologist.

Sources
 Magyar Életrajzi Lexikon
 Géza Lakatos: As I saw it: the tragedy of Hungary. Englewood, New Jersey: Universe Publishing, 1993.

1888 births
1946 deaths
People from Kula, Serbia
Defence ministers of Hungary
Hungarian soldiers
Austro-Hungarian military personnel of World War I
Austro-Hungarian generals
Hungarian people of World War II
Hungarian fascists
Hungarian Nazis
Holocaust perpetrators in Hungary
Hungarian people convicted of war crimes
Executed Hungarian collaborators with Nazi Germany
People executed by Hungary by hanging
Danube-Swabian people
Hungarians in Vojvodina
20th-century Hungarian people
People executed for war crimes
Prisoners and detainees of the United States military